Julimes is one of the 67 municipalities of Chihuahua, in northern Mexico. The municipal seat lies at Julimes. The municipality covers an area of 2,767.3 km².

As of 2010, the municipality had a total population of 4,953, up from 4,507 as of 2005. 

As of 2010, the town of Julimes had a population of 1,795. Other than the town of Julimes, the municipality had 123 localities, none of which had a population over 1,000.

Geography

Towns and villages
The municipality has 48 localities. The largest are:

References

Rio Conchos
Municipalities of Chihuahua (state)
Populated places established in 1833
1833 establishments in Mexico